The men's marathon event at the 1986 Commonwealth Games was held in Edinburgh, Scotland on 1 August 1986.

Results

References

Marathon
1986
Comm
1986 Commonwealth Games